In Greek mythology, Mese (Ancient Greek: Μέση) was one of the three Muses of the lyre together with here sisters Nete and Hypate. They were worshipped at Delphi, where the Temple of Apollo and the Oracle were located. Mese was the Muse of the middle cord of the seven noted lyre and represented one of the three strings of the said popular Greek musical instrument.

These three muses were comparable to the original three, Aoide, Melete, and Mneme. Alternatively, they were Cephisso, Apollonis, and Borysthenis, which portrayed them as the daughters of Apollo.

Notes

Greek Muses
Women in Greek mythology